Old Loves Die Hard is the fourth album by German progressive rock group Triumvirat. It was their first recording as a four-piece band with British singer Barry Palmer. It was also their last album with original bassist Dick W. Frangenberg and original drummer/lyricist Hans Bathelt.

The album was released in the United States, Canada and some other markets with a different cover from the European and compact disc editions. It features a cornered rat seen through a magnifying glass.

Track listing

"I Believe" (Fritz, Bathelt) – 7:51
"A Day in a Life" (Fritz) – 8:09
"Uranus' Dawn" – 2:57
"Pisces at Noon" – 3:51
"Panorama Dusk" – 1:21
"The History of Mystery" (Fritz, Bathelt, Palmer) – 11:49
"A Cold Old Worried Lady" (Fritz, Palmer) – 5:50
"Panic on Fifth Avenue" (Fritz) – 10:31
"Old Loves Die Hard" (Fritz) – 4:26
Bonus Track
"Take a Break Today" (Single) – 3:47

Personnel
Jürgen Fritz – keyboards, Hammond Organ, Piano, electric piano, mini Moog synthesizer, String synthesizer.
Barry Palmer – lead vocals
 Werner Frangenberg – bass guitar
Hans Bathelt – drums, percussion

References

1976 albums
Triumvirat albums
Capitol Records albums